The San Jose State Spartans football statistical leaders are individual statistical leaders of the San Jose State Spartans football program in various categories, including passing, rushing, receiving, total offense, defensive stats, and kicking. Within those areas, the lists identify single-game, single-season, and career leaders. The Spartans represent San Jose State University in the NCAA's Mountain West Conference (MW).

Although San Jose State began competing in intercollegiate football in 1893, the school's official record book considers the "modern era" to have begun in 1938. Records from before this year are often incomplete and inconsistent, and they are generally not included in these lists.

These lists are dominated by more recent players for several reasons:
 Since 1938, seasons have increased from 10 games to 11 and then 12 games in length.
 Additionally, San Jose State has been grouped in the same MW football division as Hawaii since divisional play began in 2013, meaning that it plays at Hawaii every other year (currently in odd-numbered years). This is relevant because the NCAA allows teams that play at Hawaii in a given season to schedule 13 regular-season games instead of the normal 12. The Spartans have played 13 regular-season games twice—in 2010, when it played at Hawaii when both were in the Western Athletic Conference, and 2015. The Spartans will again play 13 regular-season games in 2017.
 The NCAA didn't allow freshmen to play varsity football until 1972 (with the exception of the World War II years), allowing players to have four-year careers.
 Bowl games only began counting toward single-season and career statistics in 2002. The Spartans have played in three bowl games since this decision, giving many recent players an extra game to accumulate statistics.

These lists are updated through the end of the 2016 season.

Passing

Passing yards

Passing touchdowns

Rushing

Rushing yards

Rushing touchdowns

Receiving

Receptions

Receiving yards

Receiving touchdowns

Total offense
Total offense is the sum of passing and rushing statistics. It does not include receiving or returns.

Total offense yards

Total touchdowns

Defense

Interceptions

Tackles

Sacks

Kicking

Field goals made

Field goal percentage

References

San Jose State

Lists of California State University people